Benjamin Blech (born 1933) is an American Orthodox rabbi. He is a Professor of Talmud at Yeshiva University where he has taught since 1966, and was the rabbi of Young Israel of Oceanside for 37 years. In addition to his work in the rabbinate, Blech has written many books on Judaism and the Jewish people and speaks on Jewish topics to communities around the world.

Early life and education
Benjamin Blech was born in Zurich. He attended Mesivta Toras Emes and Yeshiva Torah Vodaas in Brooklyn for high school, and spent summers learning at the Lakewood Yeshiva. 
He received a Bachelor of Arts degree from Yeshiva University, a Master of Arts degree in social psychology from Columbia University, and rabbinic ordination from the Rabbi Isaac Elchanan Theological Seminary.

Career
Blech is the author of fourteen books with combined sales of close to half a million copies, including three as part of the highly popular Idiot's Guide series. His book Understanding Judaism: The Basics of Deed and Creed was chosen by the Union of Orthodox Jewish Congregations as "the single best book on Judaism in our generation". Together with an accompanying six-hour video, filmed by the producers of 20/20, featuring Blech, it is used as the basis for study groups in numerous synagogues and universities around the country.

In the 1980s, Blech was asked by the Lubavitcher Rebbe, Menachem Mendel Schneerson, to travel to the Far East on a speaking tour. Schneerson paid for all Blech's travel and hotel expenses for the duration of his trip.

At one point, Blech invested US$50,000 in the stock market, and over a number of years managed to turn it into $7 million, before he lost almost all of it. The experience was the catalyst for his 2003 book titled Taking Stock: A Spiritual Guide to Rising Above Life's Financial Ups and Downs.

In January 2005, Blech, along with Rabbis Barry Dov Schwartz and Jack Bemporad, became the first rabbis in history to publicly confer a blessing on a pope, when they were invited by the Vatican to visit and bless Pope John Paul II at Clementine Hall in the Apostolic Palace.

In 2010, Blech was diagnosed with cardiac amyloidosis and given six months to live. In what he considers a gift from God, Blech survived.

Personal life
Blech resides in New York City.

Published works
 
 
 
 
 
 
 
 
 
 
 
 
 , with Roy Doliner

See also
List of Orthodox Rabbis

References

External links

My Encounter with the Pope, May 15, 2009

1933 births
Orthodox Judaism
Living people
Orthodox rabbis from New York City
Yeshiva University alumni
Columbia University alumni
Yeshiva University faculty
American Modern Orthodox rabbis
Jewish American writers
Rabbi Isaac Elchanan Theological Seminary semikhah recipients
Swiss emigrants to the United States
21st-century American Jews